Roy Sakuma (born 1948) is a Hawaiian ukulele teacher and founder of the Ukulele Festival, the largest annual ukulele concert in the world. His support and teaching over the last forty years has helped fuel the ukulele's resurgence in Hawaii and in mainstream music.

Beginnings 

Roy Sakuma was born in 1948 in Hawaii. In 1964 Sakuma heard the hit song, “Sushi”, played by Herb “Ohta-San” Ohta, and became one of his students. Practicing eight to 10 hours a day he worked his way to the position of substitute instructor for Ohta-San when he was touring out of the state.

Annual Ukulele Festival 

Sakuma dropped out of high school at 16 and worked stocking shelves and eventually obtained a position with the Honolulu Parks and Recreation Department. In 1970, Sakuma and his co-workers came up with the idea for an ukulele festival. With the support of the Parks Department they put together the first festival in July 1971. Now an annual event each July, 2015 marked the 45th year of the Festival. It is held at the Kapiolani Park Bandstand in Waikiki.  It is the largest ukulele festival in the world and brings in thousands of spectators to see free concerts featuring some of the finest ukulele players.  In addition there are celebrities, Hawaiian entertainers and an ukulele orchestra composed of more than 800 students from the area. In 1988 Sakuma sought out Lyle Ritz and thirty years after Ritz released his last ukulele album, re-introduced him to his fans in Hawaii. Ritz moved to Hawaii and played at the festival for the next 3 years. Other notable ukulele players that have participated include Israel Kamakawiwoʻole and Jake Shimabukuro.

In 2004, Roy and Kathy Sakuma established Ukulele Festival Hawaii, a charitable non-profit organization to coordinate and organize the event.  The board of directors include Herb "Ohta San" Ohta; Sam Kamaka, president of Kamaka Ukulele; and Danny Kaleikini a popular entertainer and “Hawaii’s Ambassador of Aloha”.  In addition to the annual festival, the organization funds scholarships for high school seniors that are planning on attending college and helps sponsor other festivals in Hawaii.

Roy Sakuma Studios 

In 1974 Sakuma helped establish the ukulele school that now bears his name. It has always been his passion to teach, rather than being a recording performer. The studios now have four locations on O'ahu: in Kaimukī, 'Aiea, Kāne'ohe and Mililani.

Among the most famous of the students to come out of the studio was Jake Shimabukuro who studied there under Tami Akiyami for seven years.  Hundreds of the studio students perform together at the Annual Ukulele Festival each year.

Family life 

Much of Sakuma's early life was greatly colored by the mental illness suffered by his mother and brother.  He and his father and sister dealt with issues for many years. He was recently interviewed by the Hawai'i State Department of Health's Adult Mental Health Division (AMHD) News and discussed the issues that he dealt with and talked frankly about his fears that he too suffered from mental illness. It was only when he sought professional help that he learned that he was healthy.

Books 

 Treasury of Ukulele Chords - Roy Sakuma Productions (1998)

Video/DVD 

 Learn to Play the Ukulele with Roy Sakuma - Roy Sakuma Productions (2012) ASIN: B0019ZSLZG
 Ukulele Picking Techniques - Roy Sakuma - (2010) ASIN: 0966289757
 Roy Sakuma Hawaiian Style Ukulele Basic - Musical House, Hawaii ASIN: B000SUYJXG

References 

1948 births
Living people
Hawaii people of Japanese descent
Hawaiian ukulele players
Musicians from Hawaii